Ipomoea muricata, also called lavender moonvine, is a climbing vine in the genus Ipomoea, the same genus that contains the various morning glory species and sweet potato. It is native to Central America, but now distributed widely across the tropics and subtropics.

Morphology 
Ipomoea muricata is a fast annual climber, with funnel-shaped and white, reddish or lilac flowers, reminiscent of the color of lavender. The stems are twining and muricate. The leaf texture is glabrous, and its shape is ovate or orbicular.

Uses 
The various parts of the plant are used as food, medicine and poison by the peoples of its native and expanded range.

References 

muricata
Medicinal plants
Flora of Kerala
Vines
Edible plants